Syagrus morio is a species of leaf beetle from South Africa and the Democratic Republic of the Congo. It was first described from Port Natal by Edgar von Harold in 1877.

References

Eumolpinae
Beetles of the Democratic Republic of the Congo
Beetles described in 1877
Taxa named by Edgar von Harold
Insects of South Africa